The Alan John Factory is a historic structure located at 568 6th Avenue in San Diego's Gaslamp Quarter, in the U.S. state of California. It was built in 1908.

The plaque says, "This four-story building is made of concrete with a pressed brick front, and a loft-like gallery on the first floor. In 1910, George Hazard and Elwyn Gould opened a hardware store here and later used it as a warehouse. Later, Krasne's Leather Goods and Guns operated on the ground floor, and the upper floors contained the Alan John Clothing Factory."

See also
 List of Gaslamp Quarter historic buildings

External links

 
 The Alan John Factory - San Diego, CA - Signs of History

1908 establishments in California
Buildings and structures completed in 1908
Buildings and structures in San Diego
Gaslamp Quarter, San Diego

Office buildings in San Diego